Martin Moran (born December 29, 1959) is an American actor and writer who grew up in Denver, Colorado.

He attended Stanford University and is best known for his autobiographical solo show about his childhood molestation called The Tricky Part, for which he won an Obie Award and received two Drama Desk Award nominations. In 1999, Moran gave his final Broadway performance as radioman Harold Bride in a musical called Titanic, but thanks to Manhattan Concert Productions, he returned to it in 2014. 

In 2005, Moran adapted The Tricky Part into a memoir that was published by Beacon Press. In 2013 Moran debuted a second solo show All the Rage in New York, where he currently lives; in 2016, All the Rage was adapted into a memoir by Moran and was published in May by Beacon Press.

Bibliography
Memoirs
The Tricky Part: A Boy's Story of Sexual Trespass, a Man's Journey to Forgiveness, Beacon Press,  (hardcover, 2005); Vintage Books,  (paperback, 2006); Beacon Press,  (paperback, 2016)
All the Rage: A Quest, Beacon Press,  (hardcover, 2016)
Plays
All the Rage, Dramatists Play Service,  (2013)
The Tricky Part, Dramatists Play Service,  (2005)

References

External links

1959 births
21st-century American novelists
American male novelists
Obie Award recipients
Male actors from Colorado
Male actors from New York (state)
American gay actors
American gay writers
LGBT people from Colorado
LGBT people from New York (state)
Living people
20th-century American novelists
20th-century American male writers
21st-century American male writers